Botte may refer to:

The Bottom, a town of the island of Saba, the Caribbean Netherlands, formerly named Botte
Gerardine Botte, Venezuelan-American chemist
Rocco Botte (born 1983), an American actor

See also